Micro Focus Content Manager (formerly HP Records Manager, HP TRIM) is an electronic document and records management system (EDRMS) marketed by Micro Focus. Content Manager is an enterprise document and records management system for physical and electronic information designed to help businesses capture, manage, and secure business information in order to meet governance and regulatory compliance obligations.

In August 2013 HP announced that HP TRIM would be integrated into a unified platform called HP Records Manager 8.0. In June 2016, HP Records Manager 8.0 was renamed and upgraded to HP Content Manager 9. HP Content Manager is built on the code base of HP TRIM and includes capabilities from the Autonomy Records Manager and Autonomy Meridio. HP acquired Autonomy Corporation in 2011.

Hewlett Packard Enterprise sold its software division to Micro Focus of the UK in September 2016. Content Manager is now a part of Micro Focus since the transaction was closed in September 2017.

Name 
The software was formerly owned by HP Software Division and based on technology from Hewlett-Packard's 2008 acquisition of TOWER Software.  Formerly known as HP TRIM then HP Records Manager, then HP Content Manager.

Functionality
HP Records Manager is an HP Information Management Software offering.

Key features include: Enterprise Records Management to manage physical and electronic content, including Microsoft Outlook and SharePoint; Information Governance with real-time policy enforcement, compliance, supervision, and surveillance capabilities; Compliance by using a single governance platform to apply retention and disposition rules automatically across all records; eDiscovery Preparedness; In Place Management of content; Security and Audit capabilities; Certifications designed to the international standards of records management, ISO 15489: 2001, and elements of ISO16175; and Flexible Deployment options, including on-premises, cloud, hybrid or appliance deployments.

HP Records Manager is accessible from current mobile platforms, including iOS, Android and Windows smartphones.

HP TRIM Product Family
HP Records Manager is based on the code base of HP TRIM.

HP TRIM Base Package
In February 2010, HP released TRIM Version 7.  HP described this release as adding the ability to "provide transparent, policy based records management and archiving for Microsoft SharePoint environments on a single platform". (This was replaced by Enterprise Software.) This was in addition to the product's capabilities of managing electronic records and physical records in one system and in the same way regardless of their type, format or source.

HP TRIM was licensed as a base system with additional optional modules. The base package functionality was delivered through either a rich client, web client or with the HP TRIM for SharePoint module. Users could access HP TRIM functionality via Microsoft SharePoint. The HP TRIM for SharePoint modules included one for archiving and one for records management.

HP TRIM base package modules included the HP TRIM Web Client, a browser interface that complies with US 508 Accessibility Guidelines and is verified to US DoD 5015.2 V3 baseline, certified, Privacy and FOI records, meaning the software meets mandatory functional requirements for use in the United States federal government.

Since 7.2 The Document Content Index was implemented using Autonomy IDOL engine for text indexing.
 
Other base modules included:
 Content Indexing
 WebDrawer for read-only access from the Internet
 Document Caching
 Transmittal/Communications for compiling a mail registry
 Annotate/Redaction allows TIFF images to be annotated with an ability to redact or blank out sensitive information.

The Guest Gateway module allowed for a "Guest User" account with security and access restrictions and logs of all guest-user actions.  Kofax Xtension permitted images to be captured into HP TRIM directly from the Kofax Ascent Capture high-end scanning software. The LabelLink Xtension integrates with ColorBar Gold for printing of special color-coded file labels  The Directory Synchronization model mapped HP TRIM users from any LDAP  directory (such as Novell eDirectory).

Optional modules 
In addition to the base TRIM package, HP offered a number of optional modules.  They included:

 The HP TRIM Rendering module provided a fully automated process for storing both an original document and its renditions to a record
 The HP TRIM Web Content Management module managed website content and structure using a web browser
 The HP TRIM Space Management module defined a storage hierarchy model to organize content
 The HP TRIM for SharePoint Records Management module provided lifecycle records management of all SharePoint content including Web 2.0
 The HP TRIM for SharePoint Archive module let administrators set lifetime management policies for SharePoint and automatically archive entire sites with the ability to restore content when required. 
 An SAP ArchiveLink integration module for SAP AG records management let both SAP and non-SAP users review information
 The HP TRIM VERS Rendition module allowed electronic records to be stored in Victorian Electronic Records Strategy (VERS) (Australian State of Victoria) format. (VERS, a special digital records format, records and preserves content regardless of the system that created it, such that content can be read and understood in the future.  HP TRIM software is compliant with all specifications of the VERS standard.)

Standards compliance
HP TRIM complies with:

 the international standard for records management, ISO 15489
 the US Department of Defense Security Standard DoD 5015.2 Chapters 2 (mandatory requirements), 3 (classified records), 4 (Privacy and Freedom of Information Acts)
 Major US and international standards.
 the International Organization for Standardization ISO_standards 15489-1:2001 Records Management—Part 1: General 
 ISO/TR 15489-2:2001 Records Management—Part 2: Guidelines 
 AS 4390-1996 Records Management 
 ISO 2788:1986 Guidelines for the establishment and development of monolingual thesauri 
 The National Archives (TNA) of the United Kingdom TNA 2002
 Victorian Electronic Records Strategy (VERS) Australia

References

External links
 TRIM or HP Records Manager renamed as HPE Content Manager
 Micro Focus Enterprise Content Management
 Microsoft SharePoint Site
 Joint Interoperability Test Command RMA Product Register
 Introducing the Victorian Electronic Records Strategy (VERS) PROS 99/007 (Version 2), Public Record Office Victoria, Victoria, Australia, 31 July 2003
 AIIM Research on Enterprise Content Management
International Organization for Standardization
National Archives of Australia
AS ISO 15489 Records Management
Victorian Electronic Records Strategy (VERS)

TRIM Records Management System
Business software
Content management systems
Micro Focus International